Beatrice Melba Hill or Beatrice Melba Smith (sources differ) (born October 29, 1945), known by her stage name Melba Moore, is an American singer and actress.

Biography

Early life and education
Moore was born Beatrice Melba Hill or Beatrice Melba Smith (sources differ) in New York City to Gertrude Melba Smith (1920–1976), who was a singer professionally known as Bonnie Davis and Teddy Hill (1909–1978), a big band leader. Moore grew up in the Harlem section of New York until age 9 when her mother remarried jazz pianist Clement Leroy Moorman and the family relocated to Newark, New Jersey. For high school, Moore attended Newark Arts High School , graduating in 1958. In 1970, she graduated from Montclair State College with a BA in music.

Early career
Moore began her recording career in 1967, cutting the track "Magic Touch" which was left unreleased until 1986. In later years it became an enormous track on the Northern Soul Scene, eventually leading to Moore performing it live in 2009 at the Baltic Soul Weekender 3 in Germany north of Hamburg.
In 1967 she began her performing career as Dionne in the original cast of the musical Hair along with Ronnie Dyson, Paul Jabara and Diane Keaton. Moore replaced Keaton in the role of Sheila. In 1970, she won a Tony Award for Best Performance by a Featured Actress in a Musical for her portrayal of Lutiebelle in Purlie. She would not return to Broadway until 1978 when she appeared (as Marsinah) with Eartha Kitt in Timbuktu! but left the show after a few weeks and was replaced by Vanessa Shaw.

Following the success of Purlie, Moore landed two big-screen film roles, released two successful albums, 1970's I Got Love and Look What You're Doing to the Man, and co-starred with actor Clifton Davis in the then-couple's own successful variety television series in 1972. Both Moore and Davis revealed that the show was canceled after its brief run when their relationship ended. When Moore's managers and accountants left her in 1973, she returned to Newark and began singing in benefit concerts. Her career picked up after she met record manager and business promoter Charles Huggins after a performance at the Apollo Theater in 1974.

Music career
In 1975 Moore signed with Buddah Records and released the critically successful R&B album Peach Melba, which included the minor hit "I Am His Lady". The following year she scored her first significant hit with the Van McCoy-penned "This Is It", which reached the Billboard Hot 100, the top-20 position on the R&B chart, and top-10 in the UK, becoming her biggest success in that country. 'This is It' also became the number 1 disco track in the UK for that year. It would be 18 years later that Australian singer Dannii Minogue will cover this song and make it to number 10 on the ARIA charts.

In 1976 she scored her third Grammy nomination with the R&B ballad "Lean on Me", which had been recorded originally by Vivian Reed and later by Moore's idol Aretha Franklin who recorded the song as a B-side of her 1971 hit "Spanish Harlem". The song is most notable for Moore's extended long note at the end. In 1983 she re-recorded the song as a tribute to McCoy, who had died four years earlier. Throughout the rest of the 1970s, Moore struggled to match the success of "This Is It" with minor R&B/dance hits. However, her hit 'Pick Me Up, I'll Dance' released in May 1979 produced by McFadden & Whitehead and released on Epic Records did have considerable UK disco success, reaching UK chart position 48, along with a further hit that same year, also produced by McFadden & Whitehead with a cover version of the Bee Gees' hit "You Stepped into My Life", which reached the top 20 on the R&B charts and 47 on the Billboard Hot 100.

In 1982 Moore signed with Capitol Records and reached the top 5 on the R&B charts with the dance-pop/funk single "Love's Comin' at Ya", which also hit the top 20 in the UK (on EMI America EA 146) and became a sizable hit in some European countries for its post-disco sound and followed by "Mind Up Tonight", which was another top 40 hit in the UK reaching position number 22. A string of R&B hits followed, including 1983's "Keepin' My Lover Satisfied" and "Love Me Right", 1984's "Livin' For Your Love", 1985's "Read My Lips"—which later won Moore a third Grammy nomination (for Best Female Rock Vocal Performance), making her just the third black artist after Donna Summer and Michael Jackson to be nominated in the rock category—and 1985's "When You Love Me Like This".

In 1986, she scored two number 1 R&B hits, including the duet "A Little Bit More" with Freddie Jackson and "Falling". She scored other popular R&B hits including "Love the One I'm With (A Lot of Love)" and "It's Been So Long". In 1986, Moore also headlined the CBS television sitcom Melba; its debut aired the same night as the Challenger explosion and the show was abruptly cancelled, though five episodes aired that summer. Her success began to wane as the decade closed, although she managed two further Top 10 R&B hits, "Do You Really (Want My Love)" and "Lift Every Voice and Sing". Moore had a starring role in the 1990 horror film Def by Temptation.

Later career

Moore returned to Broadway in 1995 landing a part in Les Misérables. A year later, she started her long-running one-woman show, Sweet Songs of the Soul, later renamed I'm Still Standing. In 2003, Moore was featured in the film, The Fighting Temptations, which starred Cuba Gooding, Jr. and Beyoncé Knowles. In 2007, she landed a role in a production of Ain't Misbehavin'. In 2009 independent label Breaking Records released the EP Book of Dreams, in which Moore was featured. That same year Moore told her life story on TV-One's Unsung and later that year released her first R&B album in nearly 20 years, a duet with Phil Perry called The Gift of Love. Her song "Love Is" debuted on the R&B charts in 2011 at number 87. 

In 2016, Moore released the album Forever Moore. Moore has continued to tour and perform since then releasing her album The Day I Turned To You on December 13, 2019 – an album of R&B-inflected gospel music.

In 2021 Moore collaborated with Stone Foundation on the song "Now That You Want Me Back". 

In 2022, Moore performed in Washington DC in "Roll On", a gospel musical that originally opened with her in 2006.

Personal life
Moore has been married once and has a daughter. Moore was engaged in a four-year relationship with television star Clifton Davis during the early 1970s. Davis later admitted that the relationship failed due to his drug abuse and mistreatment of Moore. In September 1974, Moore married record manager and business promoter Charles Huggins. Moore and Huggins divorced after 17 years of marriage in 1991. In 1999, Huggins filed suit against Moore claiming that she had publicly defamed him by stating that he abused her economically.

Moore has described herself as a "born-again Catholic".

Awards
In addition to her Tony Award, Moore's music career brought additional accolades. She was nominated for a Grammy Award in 1971 for 'Best New Artist'. In 1976, she earned another Grammy nomination for Best Rhythm & Blues Vocal Performance - Female for the song "Lean on Me",. Moore was also nominated for Best Female Rock Vocal Performance in 1986 for "Read My Lips". Moore is also the 2012 Recipient of the Atlanta Black Theatre Festival Theatre Legend Award. Moore was inducted into the Official Rhythm & Blues Music Hall of Fame on October 4, 2015, in Detroit.

Moore received the 2015 Sandy Hosey Lifetime Achievement Award during the Artists Music Guild's 2015 AMG Heritage Awards broadcast held on November 14, 2015 in North Carolina.

Stage work
 Hair (1967)
 Purlie (1970)
 Timbuktu! (1978)
 Inacent Black (1981) 
 Broadway at the Bowl (1988)
 From the Mississippi Delta (1993, est)
 Les Misérables (1995) 
 Brooklyn (2006)
 Straight 2the Head (2013)
 Great God A'Mighty (2013)
 After Midnight (2018)

Filmography
 Cotton Comes to Harlem (1970) – Singer at the Apollo Theater (uncredited)
 The Sidelong Glances of a Pigeon Kicker (1970) – Model at Party
 Lost in the Stars (1974) - Irina
 Christmas with Flicka (1987) - Herself
 All Dogs Go to Heaven (1989) – Whippet Angel (named Annabelle in later installments) (voice)
 Yakety Yak, Take it Back (1991) - Herself and Tibi the Take it Back Butterfly (voice)
 The Fighting Temptations (2003) – Bessie Cooley

Discography

Albums

Compilation

Singles

 "Let's Stand Together" and "Take My Love" charted together on the US Billboard Dance chart, but charted separately elsewhere.

See also
List of disco artists (L-R)
List of post-disco artists and songs
Guests on Soul Train
List of performers on Top of the Pops
List of Broadway musicals stars
List of artists who reached number one on the Billboard R&B chart

References

Further reading

External links
Melba Moore's Official Myspace page

SoulTracks.com profile of Melba Moore
Melba Moore @ soulandfunkmusic.com
Melba Moore 2012 Audio Interview at Soulinterviews.com

1945 births
20th-century African-American women singers
African-American Christians
American disco singers
American gospel singers
American soul singers
Singers from New York City
Musicians from Newark, New Jersey
Newark Arts High School alumni
Drama Desk Award winners
Theatre World Award winners
Tony Award winners
Mercury Records artists
Epic Records artists
Capitol Records artists
Living people
Actresses from New York City
Actresses from Newark, New Jersey
African-American actresses
American film actresses
American television actresses
American voice actresses
20th-century American actresses
21st-century American actresses
American musical theatre actresses
American stage actresses
21st-century American women singers
20th-century American singers
21st-century American singers
20th-century American women singers
21st-century African-American women singers
African-American Catholics